Anna Petryk (born 26 October 1997) is a Ukrainian footballer who plays as a midfielder for Breiðablik in the Icelandic Besta-deild kvenna and the Ukraine women's national team.

Playing career
After playing the majority of her career with the Women's League club WFC Zhytlobud-1 Kharkiv, Petryk signed with Breiðablik in the Icelandic Besta-deild kvenna in March 2022.

References

1997 births
Living people
Ukrainian women's footballers
Women's association football midfielders
WFC Zhytlobud-1 Kharkiv players
Anna Petryk
Anna Petryk
Ukraine women's international footballers
Ukrainian expatriate women's footballers
Ukrainian expatriates in Iceland
Expatriate women's footballers in Iceland
Footballers from Kyiv